Laura Resnick (born August 17, 1962) is an American fantasy writer. She was the winner of the John W. Campbell Award for Best New Writer in Science Fiction for 1993. The daughter of science fiction author Mike Resnick, she formerly wrote romance novels under the pseudonym Laura Leone.

Early life and education 
Resnick was born in Chicago to Carol and Mike Resnick. The family moved to Cincinnati when she was young. She graduated from Georgetown and studied acting at the Webber Douglas Academy of Dramatic Art.

Career 
Resnick wrote romance novels for Harlequin for several years before switching to writing fantasy. Her first fantasy series, a trilogy titled The Chronicles of Sirkara, were reviewed by Publishers Weekly, the final two books with starred reviews.

Awards 
Romantic Times Magazine Award 1989
Romantic Times Magazine Award 1993
John W. Campbell Award 1993
Rita Award finalist, 2004
Romantic Times Magazine Award 2004

Bibliography

Novels 

The Esther Diamond Series

 Disappearing Nightly (Luna Books, 2005; reissued DAW Books, 2012)
 Doppelgangster (DAW Books, 2010)
 Unsympathetic Magic (DAW Books, 2010)
 Vamparazzi (DAW Books, 2011)
 Polterheist (DAW Books, 2012)
 The Misfortune Cookie (DAW Books, 2013)
 Abracadaver (DAW Books, Nov 2014)
 Goldzilla (DAW Books, TBA)

The Chronicles of Sirkara

"The Silerian Trilogy"
 In Legend Born (Tor Books, 1998)
 The White Dragon (Tor Books, 2003)
 The Destroyer Goddess (Tor Books, 2003)

Media Tie-In
 The Purifying Fire (A Magic: The Gathering based novel, Wizards of the Coast, July 2009 )

Romance novels (written as Laura Leone)
 One Sultry Summer (Silhouette Books, 1989)
 A Wilder Name (Silhouette Books, 1989)
 Ulterior Motives (Silhouette Books, 1989)
 Guilty Secrets (Silhouette Books, 1990)
 A Woman's Work (Silhouette Books, 1990)
 Upon A Midnight Clear (Silhouette Books, 1990)
 The Black Sheep (Silhouette Books, 1991)
 Celestial Bodies (Silhouette Books, 1991)
 The Bandit King (Silhouette Books, 1991)
 Untouched By Man (Silhouette Books, 1992)
 Under The Voodoo Moon (Silhouette Books, 1993)
 Sleight of Hand (Meteor/Kismet, 1993)
 Fever Dreams (Kensington Books, 1997)
 Nights of Fire (Ellora's Cave, 2004)
 Fallen From Grace (Five Star, 2003)

Non-Fiction 

Books
 A Blonde in Africa (Alexander Books, 1997)
 Rejection, Romance, and Royalties: The Wacky World of a Working Writer (Jefferson Press, 2007)

References

External links

Laura Resnick's web page

Bibliography

1962 births
Living people
20th-century American novelists
20th-century American short story writers
20th-century American women writers
21st-century American novelists
21st-century American short story writers
21st-century American women writers
Alumni of the Webber Douglas Academy of Dramatic Art
American fantasy writers
American romantic fiction novelists
American science fiction writers
American women short story writers
American women novelists
Georgetown University alumni
John W. Campbell Award for Best New Writer winners
Novelists from Illinois
People from Chicago
Women romantic fiction writers
Women science fiction and fantasy writers
Writers from Chicago